The South African Nuclear Energy Corporation (Necsa) was established as a public company by the Republic of South Africa Nuclear Energy Act in  and is wholly owned by the State. The name is correctly indicated above, although the sequence of letters in the acronym may be taken as suggesting that the name should be the "Nuclear Energy Corporation of South Africa".

Operations

Necsa replaced the country's Atomic Energy Corporation. Apart from several ancillary functions, the main functions of Necsa are to undertake and promote research and development in the field of nuclear energy and related technologies; to process and store nuclear material and other restricted material; and to co-ordinate with other organisations in matters falling within these spheres. Apart from its main operations at Pelindaba, Necsa also operates the Vaalputs radioactive waste disposal facility. The corporation also serves the State's other nuclear institutional obligations. The chief executive officer of Necsa is Mr. Phumzile Tshelane since 1 September 2012.

Necsa is organisationally divided into a commercial group, Pelindaba Technology (PT), which conducts business in a variety of products and markets and another group, Pelindaba Nuclear Institute (PNI), which is concerned with statutory functions, R&D, support and facility operations.  Pelindaba Technology (PT) is a portfolio of businesses of which Nuclear Technology Products (NTP) is a division and serves the international markets for radiation-based technology and products. Also, the Uranium Enrichment Corporation of South Africa, Ltd. (UCOR) which operated a facility at Valindaba (known as the 'Y' plant) to produce HEU.

Necsa employs some 1,400 people in diverse areas such as physics, engineering, chemistry and electronics. With changes in the country's positioning on nuclear involvement and South Africa's re-entry into world markets in 1990, a decision was taken to focus the organisation on commercially driven projects. Today, Necsa supplies a wide range of products and services to South African and foreign market sectors with the SAFARI-1 reactor as the cornerstone of the commercial isotope production programme. This research reactor at Pelindaba, SAFARI-1 produces medical isotopes such as Molybdenum-99 which are sold globally by the NTP. The NTP Radioisotopes Group had sales of 1.222 billion ZAR (€75M) in 2016.

History

The 20 MW research reactor SAFARI-1 was initially used for high level nuclear physics research programmes and was commissioned in 1965. In the 1970s and 1980s, amid reduced output due to embargo of international fuel supply, the focus of activities at Pelindaba was on the exploitation of South Africa's uranium resources through the successful design, construction and commissioning of commercial uranium hexafluoride, uranium enrichment, and nuclear fuel assembly production facilities. In 1993 focus shifted to commercial operations and over the following years typical output increased back to 20MW. Since 2009 the reactor has operated solely on low enriched uranium fuel.

In December 2018 the South African government replaced all members of the Necsa board, giving as reasons failures in its statutory duties, failure to adhere to shareholder instructions, financial mismanagement, remuneration irregularities and failing to restore its radioisotope manufacturing facility on schedule.  This included signing Memoranda of Understanding with foreign companies against express instructions of the government.

See also
Helikon vortex separation process
Nuclear fuel cycle
Nuclear reprocessing
South Africa and weapons of mass destruction

References

External links
 South African Nuclear Energy Corporation (NECSA) Web site
 Nuclear Liabilities Management, a division of NECSA tasked with Nuclear Waste management
 NTP Radioisotopes, a division of NECSA involved in the production and distribution of

Further reading
Fig, David (2005). "Uranium Road: Questioning South Africa's Nuclear Direction", Jacana Media.

Economy of Gauteng
Nuclear technology companies of South Africa
Nuclear power companies of South Africa